

Description  

The Centre Européen de Calcul Atomique et Moléculaire (CECAM), is the longest standing European Institute for the promotion of fundamental research on advanced computational methods and their application to problems in frontier areas of science and technology. Its current headquarters is based on the EPFL (École Polytechnique Fédérale de Lausanne) campus in Lausanne, Switzerland. 

Past

Activities to create CECAM begun in 1967, but its date of birth was set to October 1969 by its founding father, Carl Moser.

Present

CECAM has evolved from a single focal point for simulation and modelling into a network of 17 nodes across Europe and in Israel, with its headquarters (HQ) at EPFL. It is governed by a convention signed by 25 member organizations located in 13 European countries, Israel and China, which include National Research Councils, Research and HPC Centres, and Universities, from which it receives funding for ordinary activities. The CECAM nodes are, for the most part, consortia of more than one institution, constituting a network of academic and research partners located in 10 European countries and Israel.

Activities
CECAM activities, across all of the nodes, include the organization of scientific workshops in emerging areas; specialist schools to train at the graduate and postdoctoral level; workshops on software development; brain-storming and problem solving events; the development of collaborative research projects for Europe and beyond; and the sponsorship of an international visitors programs. We welcome applications to organize events and to establish networks through CECAM from everybody interested in computational science.

Member Organizations
CECAM is supported by member organizations from 13 European countries, Israel and China. These Organizations are listed in Table 1. Each Member Organization nominates two representatives to the Cecam Council, the governing body that has the ultimate responsibility for all strategy and operations of the Center.

Nodes
Nodes contribute to CECAM activities by organising and hosting workshops and schools at the level of the network (Flagship events) and locally (Node events). They initiate or participate in CECAM research and training activities, host a visitor program and promote research in computational science in their region. A CECAM node is a research structure inside a larger Institution, or a consortium of such Institutions whose activities and relationships are regulated by a formal agreement. The Directors of the nodes administer the program taking place at their respective locations, possibly in collaboration with other nodes or the Headquarters. The Directors constitute the CECAM Board of Directors, working towards a coordinated optimal selection and distribution of activities throughout the network.

References 

1969 establishments in Switzerland
International scientific organizations based in Europe
Organisations based in Lausanne
Scientific organisations based in Switzerland